Noguerana rodriguezae is a species of beetle in the family Cerambycidae. It was described by Noguera in 2005.

References

Trachyderini
Beetles described in 2005